Tollywood films of the 1930s may refer to:

 Bengali films of the 1930s
 Telugu films of the 1930s